Sophie Hyde is an Australian film director, writer, and producer based in Adelaide, South Australia. She is co-founder of Closer Productions and known for her award-winning debut fiction film, 52 Tuesdays (2013) and the comedy drama Animals (2019). She has also made several documentaries, including Life in Movement (2011), a documentary about dancer and choreographer Tanja Liedtke, and television series, such as  The Hunting (2019). Her latest film, Good Luck to You, Leo Grande, premiered at the Sundance Festival on 23 January 2022, and was released on Hulu and in cinemas in the UK and Australia.

Early life and education
As a teenager in Adelaide, Hyde learnt acting skills at the Unley Youth Theatre (later Urban Myth and now SAYarts), where she met some of her future colleagues. She later studied film theatre at Flinders University in Adelaide and followed up at La Trobe University in Melbourne, graduating with a Bachelor of Arts in 1988.

Work

2000s
In 2005, Hyde returned to Adelaide with funding to make a film about women's toilets. Later that year, she reconnected with a college acquaintance, editor and cinematographer Bryan Mason. They began a personal and professional relationship, forming a film company, Closer Productions. As of 2018, they reside in Malvern with their daughter, Audrey.

2010s
Hyde and Mason started making videos for nightclubs and dance shows, then moved to documentary films. After becoming friends with choreographer and dancer Tanja Liedtke, they started making a documentary about her. After the dancer's untimely death in a traffic accident in Sydney in 2007, they completed the film and named it Life in Movement, which was named best work at the 2011 Ruby Awards for the arts, won the 2011 Foxtel Australian Documentary Prize and won AACTA nominations for direction and for best feature documentary.
 
Hyde completed her first feature film as director, co-writer and co-producer, 52 Tuesdays, filmed in Adelaide in 2013, then spent a year promoting it. This film earned many accolades, including World Cinema Dramatic Directing Award for Hyde at Sundance in 2014 and a Crystal Bear at the Berlin International Film Festival.

Hyde's next project was a six-part TV series called Fucking Adelaide (aka F*!#ing Adelaide), commissioned by the Australian Broadcasting Corporation and Screen Australia, aired on national TV from 15 July 2018 and ABC iview after debuting at the Adelaide Film Festival in 2017. A dark comedy about "home, family, identity and the 'small town-ness' of Adelaide", each episode was a part of a story told from a different character’s perspective, including a character played by Hyde's child Audrey and also starring Tilda Cobham-Hervey, Brendan Maclean and Kate Box as three siblings who respond to their mother's (played by Pamela Rabe) request to return to the family home in Adelaide. Hyde has said that "It’s about the beautiful side of family, but also the negative side of being around people who feel like they know you, but perhaps don't allow you to change."; also that it reflects her love of Adelaide, which is greater once one has been away. The title started out as a joke, reflecting how Hyde felt about returning to Adelaide after being away — "both comforting and claustrophobic". Co-written by Matthew Cormack and Matt Vesely and produced by Rebecca Summerton, it was in competition at the Séries Mania International Festival in France2018, and screened in Berlin.

In 2018 Hyde made Animals, based on the novel of the same name by Emma Jane Unsworth, in Dublin. This was her first feature film shot abroad, and was screened in the Premieres category at the 2019 Sundance Film Festival and as an Adelaide Film Festival "pop-up" event in April 2019. It was an Irish-Australian co-production and although not initiated by Hyde, it was a Closer Productions film.

In January 2019 it was announced that a drama mini-series called The Hunting would be screened later in the year on SBS TV, produced and directed by Hyde and starring Richard Roxburgh, Asher Keddie, Pamela Rabe, Sam Reid, Jessica De Gouw, Elena Carapetis and Sachin Joab.

In My Blood It Runs (2019), directed by Gayby Baby director Maya Newell, produced by Hyde, Rachel Nanninaaq Edwardson, Larissa Behrendt and Newell and made in collaboration with Arrernte and Garrwa people in the Northern Territory, had its world premiere at the Hot Docs Canadian International Documentary Festival in Toronto in April/May 2019.

2020s
Starting to work as an international freelance director, in 2021 Hyde directed the comedy film, starring Emma Thompson, called Good Luck to You, Leo Grande. Written by Katy Brand, the film was made by Genesius Pictures in the UK. This is her first film in a long time as an independent director, without Closer Productions and with her not acting as producer as well. It premiered at the 2022 Sundance Film Festival (an online rather than in-person event because of the COVID-19 pandemic in the United States) on 23 January 2022.  It was released on Hulu in the US on 17 June 2022, in UK cinemas on the same date, and in Australian cinemas from 18 August 2022.<ref>{{cite web | title=Emma Thompson Wants Women Of All Ages To Enjoy Sexual Pleasure In 'Good Luck To You, Leo Grande | website=Marie Claire | date=20 June 2022 | url=https://www.marieclaire.com.au/good-luck-to-you-leo-grande-where-to-watch | access-date=15 August 2022}}</ref>

In April 2022 Screen Australia announced funding for a number of projects, including Jimpa, described as "an inter-generational queer family drama", to be made  by Hyde along with co-writer Matthew Cormack,  producer Liam Heyen and executive producer Audrey Mason-Hyde.

Closer Productions

Hyde is co-founder, along with Mason, of the film production company Closer Productions, which is based in the Adelaide suburb of Glenside. Other members of the Closer team are  Mason (editor, DOP, producer, director); Matthew Bate (writer, director); Rebecca Summerton (producer); Matthew Cormack (writer, sales/delivery);  Raynor Pettge (visual effects, editor); and Matt Vesely (development manager, writer, director).

Filmography
Film
As directorOk, Let's Talk About Me (2005) - short documentary. Producer, director.The Road to Wallaroo (2006) - short documentary biography. Producer, director.
 My Last Ten Hours with you (2007) - short drama/ romance LGBT-themed film, included in the Boys on Film DVD series (6: Pacific Rim). Director.
 Necessary Games (2009) - short drama/fantasy. Producer, co-director (with Kat Worth).Elephantiasis (2010) - short film. Producer, director. Winner, Best Director, World of Women Film Festival.
 Life in Movement (2011) - documentary about dancer and choreographer Tanja Liedtke. Producer/director/writer.52 Tuesdays (2014) - drama. Producer, director, co-writer with Matthew Cormack.
Animals (2019) - comedy/drama. Producer/director.
 Good Luck to You, Leo Grande (2022)

As producer

 Shut Up Little Man! An Audio Misadventure (2011) - documentary/comedy/drama (written and directed by Matthew Bate). Producer.Sam Klemke's Time Machine (2015) - feature length documentary (written and directed by Matthew Bate). Producer.
 My Best Friend is Stuck on the Ceiling (2015) - short comic film (written and directed by Matt Vesely). Co-producer.
 In My Blood It Runs (formerly Kids) (2019) - documentary (directed by Maya Newell and others). Producer.

Television
 Fucking Adelaide (2017) - TV comedy drama mini-series (6 short episodes) for ABC TV. Producer/director. AKA F*!#ing Adelaide and F**king Adelaide.The Hunting (2019) - four-part drama miniseries screening on SBS in August 2019. Producer/director.

VideoBeyond Beliefs: Muslims & Non-Muslims in Australia (2007) - documentary. Producer, writer.

Awards

Numerous nominations and awards for 52 Tuesdays.
Melbourne International Film Festival 2009 —  Best Experimental Short Film — Winner (with Kat Worth) —  Necessary GamesAACTA Awards 2012 —  Best Feature Length Documentary —  Nominee (shared with Bryan Mason) — Life in Movement (2011)
AACTA Awards 2012 —  Best Feature Length Documentary —  Nominee (shared with Matthew Bate) — Shut Up Little Man! An Audio Misadventure (2011)
AACTA Awards 2012 — Best Direction in a Documentary — Nominee (shared with Bryan Mason) — Life in Movement (2011)
Screen Producers Australia (SPA) Awards 2018 - Online Series Production of the Year – Winner (Closer Productions) –  Fucking Adelaide (2017)

See also
 List of female film and television directors
 List of LGBT-related films directed by women

References

Further reading

Audio

Video

 -  talking about Shut Up Little Man! and Life In Movement; chaired by Richard Harris, CEO of SAFC.
 (15 minutes) - the four women driving the film Animals'' talk about it.

External links
 
 

Australian film producers
People from Adelaide
Living people
1977 births
Australian women film directors
Australian film directors
Australian women film producers